Aislaby is a small village and civil parish on the north bank of the River Tees within the borough of Stockton-on-Tees and the ceremonial county of County Durham, England. It is located to the west of Eaglescliffe and Yarm. The name, first attested as Asulue(s)bi in 1086, is of Viking origin and means "Aslak's farm." Aislaby was listed in the Domesday Book of 1086.

Geography

Administration
Aislaby is historically and ceremonially located in County Durham, but for administrative purposes is located in the Borough of Stockton-on-Tees, made a unitary authority in 1996. Before this time it was in the non-metropolitan county of Cleveland, created on 1 April 1974 under the provisions of the Local Government Act 1972.

Aislaby is in the Eaglescliffe ward. It is part of the Stockton South parliamentary constituency, represented since the 2019 general election by Matt Vickers of the Conservative Party. The constituency was previously represented by Labour MP Paul Williams (2017–2019), James Wharton (Conservative, 2010–2017), and before that by Dari Taylor (Labour, 1997–2010). Prior to Brexit in 2020 it was part of the North East England constituency for elections to the European Parliament.

The local police force is Cleveland Police. Aislaby is in the Stockton district and its nearest police station is in Yarm.

Location

 
 Latitude and longitude:  (54.5, -1.4)
 Road access: Minor road off A67 in Egglescliffe
 Rail access: Yarm, Eaglescliffe and Allens West.
 Nearest airport: Teesside Airport

Notable residents
Aislaby is home to the former Middlesbrough and England national football team manager, Steve McClaren.  He bought the house that his predecessor at Middlesbrough FC, Bryan Robson, had lived in.

References

Villages in County Durham
Borough of Stockton-on-Tees
Places in the Tees Valley